Edmundo Zúñiga (born 1920) was a Chilean athlete. He competed in the men's hammer throw at the 1948 Summer Olympics.

References

External links
 

1920 births
Place of birth missing
Year of death missing
Athletes (track and field) at the 1948 Summer Olympics
Chilean male hammer throwers
Olympic athletes of Chile